The 1981–82 Boston Bruins season was the Bruins' 58th season.

Offseason

Regular season

Final standings

Schedule and results

Playoffs

Player statistics

Regular season
Scoring

Goaltending

Playoffs
Scoring

Goaltending

Awards and records

Transactions

Draft picks
Boston's draft picks at the 1981 NHL Entry Draft held at the Montreal Forum in Montreal, Quebec.

Farm teams

See also
1981–82 NHL season

References

Boston Bruins seasons
Boston Bruins
Boston Bruins
Boston Bruins
Boston Bruins
Bruins
Bruins